Zayante (Ohlone: Sayante) is a census-designated place (CDP) in Santa Cruz County, California. It is a residential area located on Zayante Creek. The 2020 United States census reported Zayante's population was 729.

History

The Sayante, a local tribe of the Ohlone people, originally inhabited the area. Early history of the area recalls the Sayante people finding shelter and game in the plentiful forests. The area provided them with enough acorns, fish from Lompico and Newell Creek, and small game to live a peaceful, easy life. Temascals (sweat lodges), songs, and games were the rule, while fighting and thievery the exception.

In 1769, the Spanish explorer Gaspar de Portolà discovered the land area which is now known as the City of Santa Cruz. When Portola came upon the river which flows from the Santa Cruz Mountains to the sea, he named it San Lorenzo in honor of Saint Lawrence. He called the rolling hills above the river, Santa Cruz, which means "holy cross". Twenty-two years later, in 1791, Father Fermin de Lasuen established Mission Santa Cruz, the twelfth mission to be founded in California.

Over the next 20 years, word spread throughout the Ohlone tribes, including the Sayante Indians, that the Santa Cruz Mission would provide a regular source of food, even through the winter, warm shelter in the winter, clothes made from woven fabrics, manufactured items both useful (such as pots and pans) and curious (trinkets such as glass beads, etc.), and education, if they came to live at the mission. Unfortunately, once lured to the mission by these things, the Indians became virtual indentured servants. For the Mission system to work it required the services of large numbers of "workers" (to till the gardens, construct and maintain buildings, etc.). This was difficult for New Spain (Mexico) to provide because few there were willing to relocate to what was considered the harsh and primitive environment of Alta (Upper) California. The missionaries truly believed they were benefiting what they considered barbaric people through teaching them the manual skills of carpentry, European farming techniques, etc., and through "civilizing" them to the Spanish / European religious and cultural beliefs and practices. This process, called cultural assimilation, shattered the ancient native culture across North America. In addition, diseases which were mostly annoyances to their European hosts decimated the Indian populace, and only small groups remained after 1820.  In 1821, Mexico achieved its independence from Spain, and California came under control of the Mexican government.  In the 1830s, Mission Santa Cruz  and other California missions were secularized by the Mexican government; only to seriously decline and, in some cases, fall into ruin.  The very last of the Sayante people was a woman who lived for many years beside Zayante Creek. When she died in 1934, she was buried somewhere among the giant redwoods in Henry Cowell Redwoods State Park. Her grave, like her people, is lost now.

The Lompico area became part of Rancho Zayante, which was granted by Mexico in 1834 to Joaquin Buelna and consisted of  just north of Henry Cowell Redwoods State Park.  The next year Buelna let his claim lapse and, in 1836, the American-born settler Isaac Graham, with his friend Henry Neale, acquired Rancho Zayante and the adjoining Rancho San Agustin via Joseph Majors, who had the required Mexican citizenship in order to be granted a Rancho. In 1841, Majors, Graham, a German named Frederick Hoeger, and a Dane named Peter Lassen, agreed to erect a mill on Zayante Creek near where it enters the San Lorenzo River. This was reputed to be the first power sawmill in California and was used to mill trees from Lompico.

While building the mill (six years before discovery of gold at a saw mill being constructed in Coloma which resulted in the California gold rush), Isaac Graham found a single gold nugget worth $32,000 (close to $1,000,000 today). In comparison, the flake that set off the California gold rush was no larger than one's little finger nail. In 1855, gold again was discovered along Zayante Creek in what is known today as Henry Cowell State Park. During the summer of that year, miners realized three to ten dollars ($70 – $225 today) a day for their efforts and the gold panning fever spread throughout the San Lorenzo Valley and up into Zayante Creek and its tributaries, including Lompico Creek. Much gold still remains in these creeks but is too cost prohibitive to extract.

By the 1850s, Felton became the hub of the logging industry and the coastal redwood trees that blanketed the area became the largest export. Early loggers described the area as dense, nearly impenetrable redwood forests, howling canyons, and frequent encounters with ferocious grizzly bears, the last of which, a silvertip sow, is said to have been killed near Bonny Doon in the late 1880s. They also struggled with a lack of access and suitable transportation for the timber. Eventually the original trusty oxen were replaced by wood burning donkey engines, of which some tracks can still be found today in Lompico. Between 1890 and 1900, the entire area was clear cut and the forest is now in the process of reestablishing itself on the young, steep slopes of marine sedimentary rock common to the California coast.

As with most of the San Lorenzo Valley, once the logging era ended, the old Rancho Zayante was subdivided and sold off to land developers who created the neighborhoods of Olympia, Zayante and Lompico.

The name Zayante maybe from sayyan-ta 'at the heel' (Rumsen Costanoan).  A parage lambda Sayanta 'place called Sayanta' is mentioned in July 1834 and the stream appears as Rio or Arroyo de Sayante on several diseños.  On July 12, 1834 the name was applied to land grants.  Named for either Zayante Creek  or the Zayante tribe, Zayante was a stop on the narrow gauge railroad that ran from Los Gatos to Santa Cruz from 1880 to 1940, primarily to ship lumber and various fruits grown in the area.  Zayante had its own post office.  The railroad was acquired by the Southern Pacific in the early 1900s, which added weekend excursion trains until the April 18, 1906, earthquake. Damage to rails, tunnels, and bridges was repaired and the railroad continued to operate until March 1940.  Later that year, State Route 17 was routed away from Zayante and other stops along the railroad right-of-way.

Today, the area around Zayante is sparsely populated, and does have one small "corner" market, The Zayante Market. Ironically, this corner market first established in 1947 and left over from a time forgotten, serves as a model for future small town developments incorporating commercial and residential, or mixed-use development.

Geography
According to the United States Census Bureau, the CDP covers an area of 2.7 square miles (7.1 km2), all of it land.

Demographics

The 2010 United States Census reported that Zayante had a population of 705. The racial makeup of Zayante was 647 (91.8%) White, 10 (1.4%) African American, 6 (0.9%) Native American, 4 (0.6%) Asian, 0 (0.0%) Pacific Islander, 18 (2.6%) from other races, and 20 (2.8%) from two or more races. Hispanic or Latino of any race were 57 people (8.1%).

The Census reported that 705 people (100% of the population) lived in households, 0 (0%) lived in non-institutionalized group quarters, and 0 (0%) were institutionalized.

There were 304 households, out of which 80 (26.3%) had children under the age of 18 living in them, 120 (39.5%) were opposite-sex married couples living together, 28 (9.2%) had a female householder with no husband present, 20 (6.6%) had a male householder with no wife present.  There were 35 (11.5%) unmarried opposite-sex partnerships, and 5 (1.6%) same-sex married couples or partnerships. 91 households (29.9%) were made up of individuals, and 18 (5.9%) had someone living alone who was 65 years of age or older. The average household size was 2.32.  There were 168 families (55.3% of all households); the average family size was 2.83.

The population was spread out, with 129 people (18.3%) under the age of 18, 59 people (8.4%) aged 18 to 24, 221 people (31.3%) aged 25 to 44, 249 people (35.3%) aged 45 to 64, and 47 people (6.7%) who were 65 years of age or older.  The median age was 40.7 years. For every 100 females, there were 104.9 males.  For every 100 females age 18 and over, there were 108.7 males.

The homeowner vacancy rate was 1.8%; the rental vacancy rate was 6.3%.  514 people (72.9% of the population) lived in owner-occupied housing units and 191 people (27.1%) lived in rental housing units.

References

Census-designated places in Santa Cruz County, California
Census-designated places in California